Martín Magdaleno Dihigo Llanos (May 25, 1906 – May 20, 1971), called The Immortal, was a Cuban professional baseball player. He played in Negro league baseball and Latin American leagues from 1923 to 1936 as a two-way player, both as a pitcher and a second baseman, although he excelled at several positions.

Early career 

Dihigo was born in the sugarmill town of Cidra in Matanzas Province, Cuba. He began his professional baseball career in the winter of 1922-23 at the age of 16 as a substitute infielder for Habana in the Cuban League. The following summer, Dihigo broke into American baseball as a first baseman for the Cuban Stars. Over the course of his career, he played all nine positions. As a pitcher, he once defeated Satchel Paige while Paige was touring Cuba.

Negro leagues 

Dihigo's career record in twelve seasons in the Negro leagues was a .307 average and .511 slugging percentage, with 431 hits, 64 home runs, 61 doubles, 17 triples, 227 RBI, and 292 runs scored in 1404 at bats. He drew 143 walks and stole 41 bases. As a pitcher, he went 26–19 with a 2.92 ERA, with 176 strikeouts and 80 walks in 354 innings. Dihigo served as player-manager of the New York Cubans in 1935 and 1936.

Mexican and Cuban leagues 

In another season in the Mexican League, he had a 0.15 ERA. In his Mexican career, he was 119-57 with a .317 batting average. In the Cuban League, he was 107-56 as a pitcher with a .298 average at the plate. Dihigo continued his playing career in Mexico into the early 1950s. He served as Cuba's Minister of Sport from 1959 until his death in 1971. In Cuba, Dihigo was known as "El Inmortal" ("The Immortal"); in other Latin American countries, he was sometimes called "El Maestro" ("The Master").

Career stats 

In Dihigo's career, including statistics from Dominican, American, Cuban, and Mexican leagues, he compiled a lifetime .302 career batting average with 130 home runs, although eleven seasons of home run totals are missing. As a pitcher, he compiled a 252-132 win–loss record.

Post career 

After retiring, Dihigo became a radio announcer for the Cuban Winter League. He fled Cuba in 1952 to protest the rise of Fulgencio Batista. He managed the Leones del Caracas in the 1953 Caribbean Series but finished last. Upon Fidel Castro's rise to power, Dihigo returned to Cuba and was appointed the minister of sports.

Death and Hall of Fame Inductions 

Dihigo died five days before his 65th birthday, on May 20, 1971, in Cienfuegos, Cuba. He is buried in Cementerio Municipal Cruces in Cruces, Cienfuegos, Cuba.

Dihigo was also inducted into the Hispanic Heritage Baseball Museum Hall of Fame.

Martín Dihigo's stature as a ballplayer is reflected in this conversation between former Dodgers general manager Al Campanis and broadcaster Jaime Jarrín:

Others had heaped praise on him earlier, as well. Buck Leonard said, “He was the best ballplayer of all time, black or white.”

Hall of Famer Johnny Mize said, “He was the only guy I ever saw who could play all nine positions, manage, run and switch-hit.”

Along with Willie Wells, Dihigo is just one of two players to be inducted to the American, Cuban, Mexican, 
Dominican Republic and Venezuelan Baseball Halls of Fame.

See also

 List of members of the Mexican Professional Baseball Hall of Fame

Notes

References

External links

 and Baseball-Reference Black Baseball / Minor league stats and Seamheads
  and Seamheads
Martín Dihigo at SABR (Baseball BioProject)
Martín Dihigo at Baseball Biography

1906 births
1971 deaths
Águilas Cibaeñas players
Cuban expatriate baseball players in the Dominican Republic
Algodoneros de Torreón players
Azules de Veracruz players
Baltimore Black Sox players
Caribbean Series managers
Cuban Stars (East) players
Homestead Grays players
Leopardos de Santa Clara players
Mexican Baseball Hall of Fame inductees
Mexican League baseball managers
National Baseball Hall of Fame inductees
Negro league baseball managers
New York Cubans players
People from Cienfuegos Province
People from Matanzas Province
Philadelphia Hilldale Giants players
Rojos del Águila de Veracruz players
Tecolotes de Nuevo Laredo players
Tuneros de San Luis Potosí players
Cuban expatriate baseball players in Mexico
Cuban expatriate baseball players in the United States